Molly Bawn is a 1916 British silent drama film directed by Cecil M. Hepworth and starring Alma Taylor, Stewart Rome and Violet Hopson. It is an adaptation of the 1878 Irish novel Molly Bawn by Margaret Wolfe Hungerford.

Cast
 Alma Taylor as Eleanor Massareene 
 Stewart Rome as Tedcastle Luttrell 
 Violet Hopson as Marcia Amherst  
 Lionelle Howard as Philip Shadwell  
 Fred Wright as Mr. Amherst  
 Chrissie White as Lady Cecil Stafford  
 John MacAndrews as John Massareene  
 Henry Vibart as Marigny  
 Valerie McClintock as Letitia Massareene  
 Percy Manton as Plantaganet Potts

References

Bibliography
 Goble, Alan. The Complete Index to Literary Sources in Film. Walter de Gruyter, 1999.

External links

1916 films
1916 drama films
British drama films
British silent feature films
Films directed by Cecil Hepworth
Films based on Irish novels
Hepworth Pictures films
British black-and-white films
1910s English-language films
1910s British films
Silent drama films